The Venice–Udine railway is an Italian railway line connecting Venice, in Veneto, with Udine, in Friuli Venezia Giulia. It follows the same route as state highway 13 (SS 13, "Pontebbana").
 
The railway infrastructure is managed by the Rete Ferroviaria Italiana, which classifies it as one of its primary lines. 
 

History 

The section between Mestre and Udine was opened between 1851 and 1860.

The electrification of the Mestre–Udine section at 3000 volts DC was officially inaugurated in October 1960.

Standards
The line is a double-track line entirely electrified at 3000 volts DC. The major cities crossed, in addition to the two termini, are Treviso and Pordenone.
 
The line is signalled with the Sistema di Comando e Controllo (SCC), a form of centralized traffic control.

Rail traffic
Services are mainly operated by Trenitalia and consist of regional services, long-distance connections from Udine to Milan and Rome and from Venice to Vienna and Munich. In summary, the trains that operate on this line are:
 regional
 regional express
 Intercity
 Eurocity
 Frecciarossa
 Italo AV (since October 2019)

References

Notes

Footnotes

Sources
 
 
 
 

Railway lines in Veneto
Railway lines in Friuli-Venezia Giulia
1851 establishments in Italy
Railway lines opened in 1851